is a Japanese 3DCG anime series featuring a crossover between characters from Science Ninja Team Gatchaman, Casshan, Hurricane Polymar and Tekkaman: The Space Knight, all series produced by Tatsunoko Production in the 1970s. The new series is a co-production between Tatsunoko and Digital Frontier and aired from October 3 to December 26, 2017.

Plot
Emi is a seventeen-year-old girl living in Shibuya, Tokyo. Her father is always away with work and she's grown listless. Suddenly, a twist of fate involving a certain magical item changes everything. A mysterious pencil, of all things, is linked to the appearance of heroes from another world! Could this be the start to the excitement she's so desperately craving, or is there something more?

Characters

 The main protagonist. Emi is an aloof 17-year-old girl who lives alone in her house since her father has left for unexplained reasons. When meeting the four heroes, she comes across an artifact known as "Case", that has the power of making wishes come true. In her hands, the Case takes the form of a large pencil, reflecting her desire to draw. She is later revealed to be Z's daughter.

Twenty four year old Ken is the oldest of the four heroes and acts as their leader. He usually reprimands Emi when she misbehaves and is determined to save her, while restoring the worlds Z destroyed. He has the power of transforming into Gatchaman G-01. During his first encounter with Z, he manages to make him drop the Case, which ends up in Emi's hands.

Twenty two year old Jouji is an astronaut looking for a new planet for his people to settle in his original world. He fights as Tekkaman using the "Tekset" armor armed with a double-bladed lance.

Twenty year old Takeshi is a former agent with the ability to transform himself into Hurricane Polymar using a special polymer that gives him special powers. After his world is destroyed by Z, he lives for one year as a detective in Shibuya until he meets Emi and the other heroes.

Seventeen year old Tetsuya is the youngest of the four heroes. In his world, Tetsuya was transformed into an android called "Casshan" by his father to fight other androids who threaten human race, after his world is destroyed, he meets the other heroes and Emi, joining them with his pet companion, the robotic dog .

 Emi's father and the main antagonist, Kazumichi Kaido is a man who takes possession of the Case and under the alias of Z, destroys other worlds to fulfill his wish of protecting Emi. His research leads him to discover that in all parallel worlds, Emi is destined to have a tragic death in front of his eyes, so he sealed her in a closed world to protect her. In his hands, the Case takes the form of a small sun, reflecting a memory of his past when he watched the sunset with his daughter.

 Damian Grey is a mysterious, flamboyant man who approaches Takeshi and hires his services to track down the Case. He then reveals himself the be a dangerous monster who intends to take the Case for himself in order to become the perfect evil.

 A woman from a dying race of inhumans who seeks strong genes to revive her people. She joins forces with Z, intending to take his genes, until she discovers that he is not human anymore, and attacks Emi instead.

Media

Anime
The anime was announced on March 26, 2016. It was inspired by the manga of the same name, but follows an original story. Kiyotaka Suzuki directed the series, while Toshiya Ono supervised scripts. Oh! great designed the original character concepts, Koji Nakakita handled the suit and mechanical designs, and Keiichi Sato designed the original hero concepts. The anime aired as part of NTV's AnichU one-hour programming block. The opening theme is "To be continued ... " performed by Flumpool and the ending theme is "Tick-Tock" performed by Edda. Viz Media announced during Anime Weekend Atlanta that they have licensed both the anime series and the film. It is being streamed on Tubi TV.

Manga
The manga was serialized in Hero's Inc.'s Monthly Hero's magazine from October 31, 2015 to December 25, 2020. It was written by Ukyō Kodachi and illustrated by Tatsuma Ejiri. Udon Entertainment announced during their Anime Expo 2017 panel that they have licensed the manga.

Film
A theatrical film, was released on February 24, 2018. It is distributed by Shochiku and Square Enix. The cast of the TV series reprises their roles, with the addition of Kazuma Suzuki as Joe Asakura / Gatchaman G-02 of Science Ninja Team Gatchaman. Viz Media released the film on Blu-ray in the U.S. on January 5, 2021.

References

External links
 Official anime and film website 
 

2017 anime television series debuts
2015 manga
Anime and manga about parallel universes
Casshern
Crossover anime and manga
Crossover tokusatsu television series
Gatchaman
Fiction about government
Japanese computer-animated television series
Mecha
Medialink
Nippon TV original programming
Fiction about robots
Robots in television
Seinen manga
Shogakukan manga
Tatsunoko Production
Television series set in the future
Television shows set in Asia
Television shows set in Japan
Television shows set in Tokyo
Transforming heroes
Viz Media anime
Yomiuri Telecasting Corporation original programming